Anthony J. Stone is a British theoretical chemist and emeritus professor in the Department of Chemistry at the University of Cambridge.

Education
Stone studied Natural Sciences at Emmanuel College, Cambridge and obtained a Ph.D. in theoretical chemistry under H. Christopher Longuet-Higgins.

Career and research
In 1964 he took up a position in the Department of Chemistry at the University of Cambridge, where he remained until his retirement in 2006. He is known for the Stone–Wales defect of fullerene isomers.

References

British chemists
Theoretical chemists
Members of the University of Cambridge Department of Chemistry
Fellows of Emmanuel College, Cambridge
Living people
Year of birth missing (living people)
Alumni of Emmanuel College, Cambridge